Lidan is a Swedish river in the historical province Västergötland and the current Västra Götalands län. Lidan flows into Vänern by Lidköping and therefore the name of the city Lid-köping. The river begins in the highland of Ulricehamn. Asp is having the river as its habitat. The river is 93 kilometer long and its basin is 2.262 km².

References

Rivers of Västra Götaland County